The 1985–86 season was Blackpool F.C.'s 78th season (75th consecutive) in the Football League. They competed in the 24-team Division Three, then the third tier of English league football, finishing twelfth.

Eamon O'Keefe was the club's top scorer, with seventeen goals.

Table

References

Blackpool F.C.
Blackpool F.C. seasons
Blackpool F.C.